Allis State Park is a state park in Brookfield, Vermont.  Established in 1928, Allis State Park was the second state park to be created in Vermont.  It is named for Wallace S. Allis, who willed his Bear Mountain Farm to the State of Vermont to be developed as a campground and recreational area.  The park was developed by the Civilian Conservation Corps (CCC) beginning in 1932, which built the access roads, constructed a picnic shelter, picnic grounds and a campground.  There is a fire/lookout tower on Bear Hill.  Limited trash service, hot showers and running water are available.  There are picnic tables, grills and fireplaces.

Location and features
Allis State Park encompasses  of uplands in the watershed of Vermont's White River in western Brookfield, occupying part of a ridge bounded on the east by Bear Hill Road/Vermont Route 65 and on the west by Vermont Route 12.  The park itself is accessed from Bear Hill Road/VT 65, which is one of the last remaining Vermont state highways that is still maintained as a gravel road.

The park's principal feature is the summit of Bear Hill, which is accessed via the park road from Bear Hill Road.  The park road rises to the west before bending south, after which it reaches the entrance gate and then subsequently splits.  The right-hand road loops around the campground, while the left-hand road serves the day-use area, which includes the picnic area, picnic pavilion, and fire/lookout tower.

The campground loop has 18 tent sites, along with 8 lean-to sites, for a total of 26 campsites.  Water is available from faucets throughout the campground, and there is a comfort station with restrooms near the middle of the camping loop where showers are available.  There is also a campsite for group camping that is set apart from the rest of the campsites.  The day-use area connects to the campground via a short, marked trail.

The Bear Hill Nature Trail is a 3/4 mile hiking loop that connects to the day-use/picnic area at both ends.  A horseshoe pit is also located at the picnic area.  The fire/lookout tower, at the center of the picnic area, provides 360 degree views of the surrounding mountains of Vermont.  The picnic pavilion has handicap-accessible restrooms that serve the day-use area.

As of the 2019 season, Allis State Park has no day-use fee.  The standard Vermont State Park camping fees apply to the campsites.

History
The park was created in 1928 when Wallace Allis gifted his farm to the people of Vermont.  Prior to making the gift, Allis had allowed area residents to the upper areas of his farm, which provide views over the surrounding countryside.  The park facilities were developed in the 1930s by the Civilian Conservation Corps, which constructed the access road, camping loop, and picnic pavilion.  The park facilities were listed on the National Register of Historic Places in 2002.

See also

National Register of Historic Places listings in Orange County, Vermont

References

External links
Official website

State parks of Vermont
Protected areas of Orange County, Vermont
Brookfield, Vermont
National Register of Historic Places in Orange County, Vermont
Parks on the National Register of Historic Places in Vermont
Civilian Conservation Corps in Vermont
1928 establishments in Vermont
Protected areas established in 1928
National Park Service Rustic architecture